The Real Thing: Words and Sounds Vol. 3 is the third studio album by American singer Jill Scott, released on September 25, 2007, by Hidden Beach Recordings. It received positive reviews from music critics.

On certain editions of the album, recordings of live performances of "Golden" and "The Fact Is (I Need You)" are included as bonus tracks. A deluxe limited edition of The Real Thing: Words and Sounds Vol. 3 was also released, containing a bonus DVD. On March 17, 2009, the album was certified gold by the Recording Industry Association of America (RIAA). It was Scott's last release on Hidden Beach Recordings before her departure from the label in 2010. This is also the final installment of the Words and Sounds series.

Background
In an interview with HitQuarters, producer JR Hutson commented on the creation of the song "Whenever You're Around": 
"I tried to take a real Quincy Jones approach to that record. I brought in a lot of musicians and we were just vibing to a few different things, and that was one of the tracks that stood out to me in the jam session that day. So I [...] tweaked and tweaked the track, edited it [...] and reformatted it, and then eventually ended up with that track."

Commercial performance
In the United States, the album debuted at number four on the Billboard 200 and number two on Billboard Top R&B/Hip-Hop Albums chart, selling 148,000 copies in its first week, Scott's second highest debut on both charts after 2004's Beautifully Human: Words and Sounds Vol. 2. The album was certified gold by the Recording Industry Association of America (RIAA) on March 17, 2009, and by April 2011, it had sold 663,000 copies in the US alone. Elsewhere, The Real Thing: Words and Sounds Vol. 3 charted at number 65 in the Netherlands, number 75 in the United Kingdom, and number 128 in France.

Singles
Lead single "Hate on Me" is an unusual song for Scott, stepping out of her soft and smooth soul style and into a bigger, jazzier, more sassy style. In the album sampler, Scott says it is addressed to a group of people she found online who were "hating on her". Amber Riley's character Mercedes Jones performed the song on the Glee episode titled "Throwdown", aired October 14, 2009. "My Love" was released as the second single, for which a music video premiered on September 2, 2007. The third and final single was "Whenever You're Around" and features George Duke. While there was no video shot, the promotional single was successful at R&B radio stations, reaching number 56 on the Hot R&B/Hip-Hop Songs chart and number 16 on the Hot Adult R&B Airplay chart.

Critical reception

The Real Thing: Words and Sounds Vol. 3 received generally positive reviews from music critics. At Metacritic, which assigns a normalized rating out of 100 to reviews from mainstream critics, the album received an average score of 79, based on 11 reviews. Uncut magazine commended Scott's funky sensibilities and attempt to expand on the "tempo-and libido" of her 2004 album Beautifully Human: Words and Sounds Vol. 2. Mojo called the album "her most intense, but perhaps also her most pleasurable excursion yet." In his review for MSN Music, Robert Christgau said that Scott substantiates the songs' sexual content through her phrasing, timbre, and lyrics about physical pleasure, and that the album is musically consistent because of "a contour and a groove that suits its well-inhabited breakup concept."

Track listing

Notes
  signifies a co-producer

Charts

Weekly charts

Year-end charts

Certifications

Notes

References

2007 albums
Albums produced by Dre & Vidal
Albums produced by Scott Storch
Hidden Beach Recordings albums
Jill Scott (singer) albums
Sequel albums